Here follows a list of notable alumni and faculty of Brandeis University.

Notable alumni

Academia 
 Eve Adler, Classicist, professor at Middlebury College
 Amnon Albeck, Chemist, professor and University's Vice-Rector at Bar-Ilan University
 Frederick Alt, Geneticist at Harvard Medical School and Howard Hughes Medical Institute investigator.
 Arjun Appadurai, Anthropologist and editor of Public Culture
 Elliot Aronson, Social psychologist known for research on the theory of cognitive dissonance
 Seyla Benhabib, Professor of political science and philosophy at Yale University
 Bonnie Berger, Professor of applied mathematics, Massachusetts Institute of Technology
 Ilan Berman, Vice President of the American Foreign Policy Council
 David Bernstein, Law professor and blogger
 Deborah Bial, Education strategist, founder and President of Posse Foundation, MacArthur Fellow
 Richard Burgin, Professor, fiction writer, critic, founder and editor of Boulevard literary magazine
 Nancy Chodorow, Feminist sociologist and psychoanalyst
 Arthur L.Caplan, Professor of Bioethics
 Angela Davis, Political activist, academic and author
 Donna Robinson Divine, Professor at Smith College
 Jean Bethke Elshtain, Professor at the University of Chicago Divinity School, feminist, political philosopher
 Daniel A. Foss, Sociologist
 Perry A. Frey, Professor of biochemistry at University of Wisconsin–Madison
 Robert Gallucci, President of the MacArthur Foundation
 Sherwood Gorbach, Emeritus Professor at Tufts University School of Medicine
 Herbert Gross, Professor of Mathematics, Bunker Hill Community College, Corning Community College, Massachusetts Institute of Technology
 John Hopps, Physicist, politician
 Evelyn Fox Keller, Historian and philosopher of science, MacArthur Fellow 1992
David Kertzer, Anthropologist at Brown University; Pulitzer Prize-winning author of The Pope and Mussolini
 Deborah Lipstadt, History professor, Emory University
 George Loewenstein, Professor of Economics and Psychology at Carnegie Mellon University
 Roderick MacKinnon, Professor at Rockefeller University, Nobel Prize in Chemistry
 Fatema Mernissi, Moroccan sociologist
Joseph S. Murphy, President of Queens College, President of Bennington College, and Chancellor of the City University of New York
 Elisa New, Professor, Harvard University, wife of Lawrence Summers, former President of Harvard University
 David Oshinsky, Pulitzer Prize-winning historian, professor
 Alicia Ostriker, Poet, professor at Rutgers University
 Lawrence Rosen, Anthropologist and law professor
 Philip Rubin, Cognitive scientist, CEO Emeritus, Haskins Laboratories
 Paul Sally, Professor of mathematics, University of Chicago
 Michael Sandel, Professor of political philosophy, Harvard University and former member of The President's Council on Bioethics
 Lawrence Schiffman, Historian of ancient Judaism and Vice-Provost at Yeshiva University
 Joan Wallach Scott, Historian of France and pioneer in the field of gender history
 Judith Shapiro, Former President, Barnard College
 Elaine Showalter, Literary critic
 Lawrence Solan, Professor of law at Brooklyn Law School 
 Hortense Spillers, Literary critic, Black feminist scholar and the Gertrude Conaway Vanderbilt Professor at Vanderbilt University
 Maurice R. Stein, Author of Blueprint for Counter Education (1970), founding dean of the School of Critical Studies at the California Institute of the Arts, and a professor of sociology at Brandeis University
 Alan Taylor, Pulitzer-Prize-winning historian, professor at UC Davis
 Fernando Torres-Gil, Associate Dean and professor of public policy, UCLA School of Public Affairs
 Paul Townsend, Physicist, notable for work on String Theory
 Karen Uhlenbeck, Mathematics professor, MacArthur Fellow, awarded Leroy P. Steele Prize for research, first woman to win the Abel Prize.
 Judith G. Voet, Professor of chemistry and biochemistry at Swarthmore College, author of biochemistry textbooks
 Theo Wallimann, Professor, Biochemist/Cell Biologist at ETH Zurich
 Michael Walzer, Professor of social science at the Institute for Advanced Study
 Edward Witten, Physicist, awarded Fields Medal in 1990
 Rich Yampell, Grammarian, Klingon Language Institute
 David B. Yoffie, Professor of International Business Administration at Harvard Business School
 Julian E. Zelizer, Professor of American political history at Princeton University
 Robert J. Zimmer, President, University of Chicago

Arts and media 
 Kathy Acker, Novelist
 Mitch Albom, Sports columnist for the Detroit Free Press, author of Tuesdays With Morrie and The Five People You Meet in Heaven
 Paula Apsell, Executive Producer of Nova, the longest-running science documentary series and winner of eight Emmy Awards
 Ross Bauer, composer
 Stanley Bing (aka Gil Schwartz), Author, columnist for Fortune and Esquire; Executive Vice President of CBS Corporation
 Dan Blum, Novelist
Elizabeth Bruenig, writer and opinion columnist for The Washington Post
 David Brudnoy, Talk radio host in Boston
 Samrat Chakrabarti, British-American actor
 Peter Child, Composer
 Joe Conason, Political columnist for The New York Observer
 David Crane, Co-creator, writer, and executive producer of television series Friends
 Steven Culp, Actor
 Tyne Daly, Actress,  co-starred in TV series Cagney & Lacey
 Stuart Damon (Stuart Michael Zonis), Actor, played Dr. Alan Quartermaine for thirty years on the TV soap opera General Hospital
 Loretta Devine, Actress in TV series Boston Public and Grey's Anatomy, and films, including Crash
 Josh Dibb (aka Deakin), Musician, member of Animal Collective
 Alan Ehrenhalt, Senior editor of Governing, contributing writer to The New York Times
 Thomas Friedman, Foreign affairs columnist for The New York Times; winner of the National Book Award and three Pulitzer Prizes
 Lindsay Gardner, Media executive
 Gary David Goldberg, Television writer and producer
 Tony Goldwyn, Actor and director
 Karen Lynn Gorney, Actress
Alexander Gould, Actor known for roles in Finding Nemo and Weeds
 Debra Granik, Film director and screenwriter
 Mark Halliday, Poet
 Marshall Herskovitz, TV and film producer, director and screenwriter
 Dan Hirschhorn, Time.com
 Kay Hymowitz, Conservative commentator, Manhattan Institute scholar
 Chuck Israels, Jazz musician, bassist
 Margo Jefferson, The New York Times theater critic, winner of Pulitzer Prize for Criticism
 Ha Jin, Novelist,  winner of the 2000 PEN/Faulkner Award
 Michael Kaiser, President, John F. Kennedy Center for the Performing Arts
 Myq Kaplan, Comedian
 Marta Kauffman, Executive Producer and co-creator of the Emmy Award-winning television series Friends
 Jesse Kellerman, Novelist and playwright, son of novelists Jonathan Kellerman and Faye Kellerman
 Arghavan Khosravi, painter, sculptor and illustrator, attended the postbaccalaureate program in 2015.
 Jon Landau, Music critic, manager and record producer
 Susan B. Landau, Film and television producer (Cool Runnings, Mary and Rhoda)
 Louise Lasser, Actress, ex-wife of Woody Allen
 Abby Leigh, Artist
 Mark Leyner, Postmodern novelist
 Peter Lieberson, Composer
 Charlene Liu, Artist
 Steven Mackey, Composer
 Michael McDowell, Novelist and script writer
 Gates McFadden, Actress, best known as Dr. Beverly Crusher on the television series Star Trek: The Next Generation
 Kathleen McInerney, Voice actress, Ash Ketchum seasons 1–8 on Pokémon
 Debra Messing, Actress in television series Will & Grace and The Starter Wife
 Walter Mossberg, Wall Street Journal technology columnist
 Josh Mostel, Actor, son of actor Zero Mostel
 Susana Naidich, Argentine singer
 Barry Newman, Actor
Marc Tyler Nobleman, Author
 Anand Patwardhan, Documentary filmmaker
 Martin Peretz, Editor-in-chief of The New Republic
 Letty Cottin Pogrebin, Author, journalist, social activist, a founding editor of Ms. magazine
 Patrik-Ian Polk, Writer-producer of Noah's Arc
 Deborah Porter, Critic, non-profit director, founder of the Boston Book Festival
 Tom Rapp, Singer/songwriter, previously of Pearls Before Swine
 Guy Raz, Host of National Public Radio's All Things Considered
 Theresa Rebeck, Playwright and novelist
 Nancy Richler, Novelist
 Nathan J. Robinson, Columnist and founding editor of Current Affairs
 Jeff Rubens, Bridge player, writer and editor
 Richard Rubin, Actor, television personality, and reality star of Beauty and the Geek
 David Ian Salter, Film editor of Toy Story 2 and Finding Nemo
 Nick Savides, Realism artist
 Bill Schneider, CNN's senior political analyst
 Bob Simon, CBS television correspondent for 60 Minutes
 Arunoday Singh, Bollywood actor; grandson of Indian politician Arjun Singh
 Sunny Singh, Writer
 Daniel Smith, Writer
 Laura J. Snyder, Historian, philosopher, and author
 Paul Solman, Journalist for PBS
 Christina Hoff Sommers, Author, resident scholar at the American Enterprise Institute
 Karen Sosnoski, Author and filmmaker
 Michael Sugar, Film and TV producer/Oscar winner for Spotlight
 Gary Tinterow (B.A. 1976), art historian and curator
 Eric Tuchman (B.A. 1984), Emmy Award-winning showrunner of The Handmaid's Tale
 Jonathan Vankin, Senior Editor, Vertigo Comics
 Robin Weigert, Actress, played Calamity Jane in Deadwood on HBO
 Adam D. Weinberg, Director of Whitney Museum of American Art
 Eliza Wyatt, Playwright, author, and sculptor

Business
 Leonard Asper, Chief Operating Officer, CanWest
 Mitch Caplan, Former president and CEO, E*Trade Financial Corporation
 Christie Hefner, Former Chairman & CEO, Playboy Enterprises, Inc., daughter of Hugh Hefner
 Brian Hirsch, venture capitalist
 Myra Hiatt Kraft, Philanthropist and late wife of Bob Kraft, owner of New England Patriots NFL football team
 Suk-Won Kim, Chair of Ssangyong Business Group, one of the largest companies in the Republic of Korea
 Ólafur Jóhann Ólafsson, Executive Vice President of Time Warner, former CEO and president of Sony Interactive Entertainment, responsible for the introduction of PlayStation
 Bobby Sager, Philanthropist, photographer, former president of Gordon Brothers Group
 Robert F.X. Sillerman, Media entrepreneur; CEO of CKX, Inc. (owner of Elvis Presley Enterprises and American Idol)
 Louise Sunshine, Real estate professional and founder of the Sunshine Group
 Scott A. Travers, Noted numismatist and author.
 Ellis Verdi, Advertising executive and co-founder of the DeVito/Verdi advertising agency

Government, law, politics and non-profits 

 Jack Abramoff, Republican activist; founder, International Freedom Foundation, former lobbyist (convicted of mail fraud, conspiracy to bribe public officials, and tax evasion)
 Donna Arzt, Human rights attorney, law professor
 Françoise Blime-Dutertre, French philosopher
 Sidney Blumenthal, Adviser to President Bill Clinton and journalist
 Naomi Reice Buchwald, United States District Court Judge, Southern District of New York
 Jennifer Casolo, Peace activist
 Bernard Coard, Grenadian politician who led the coup that ousted Maurice Bishop
 Ruth Deech, Baroness Deech, Member of the House of Lords, UK
 Gustavo Gelpi, United States District Court Judge, District of Puerto Rico
 Geir Haarde, Prime Minister of Iceland
 Wakako Hironaka, Member of the Diet of Japan, State Minister, Director-General of the Environment Agency (1993–94)
 Abbie Hoffman, Social and political activist; co-founder of the Youth International Party ("Yippies")
 Michael E. Horowitz, Inspector General for the United States Department of Justice
 Otis Johnson, Mayor of Savannah, Georgia
 Joette Katz, Associate Justice of the Connecticut Supreme Court
 Lisa Kubiske, United States Ambassador to Honduras
 Robert Lasnik, United States District Court Judge, Western District of Washington
 Osman Faruk Loğoğlu, Ambassador to the United States from the Republic of Turkey
 Roslynn Mauskopf, United States District Court Judge, Eastern District of New York
 Vineeta Rai, Indian Administrative Service officer; former Revenue Secretary, Government of India; voted one of 25 Most Powerful Women in Business in India
 Rakesh Rajani, Tanzanian Civil Society Leader
 Michael Ratner, President of the Center for Constitutional Rights, a non-profit human rights litigation organization
 Lois Galgay Reckitt, executive director, Family Crisis Services of Portland, Maine
 Lauren Rikleen, Author, lawyer, workplace expert
 Edgar Romano, managing senior partner at the New York City law firm Pasternack Tilker Ziegler Walsh Stanton & Romano, LLP
 Stanley Roth, Assistant Secretary of State for East Asian and Pacific Affairs, 1997–2001
 Dimitrij Rupel, Minister of Foreign Affairs of the Republic of Slovenia
 George Saitoti, Vice President of the Republic of Kenya
 Ari Schwartz, Chief operating officer, Center for Democracy and Technology
 Eli J. Segal, Assistant to the President of the United States 1993–1996
 Daniel B. Shapiro, Former United States Ambassador to Israel
 Daniel Sokatch, CEO of the New Israel Fund
 Stephen J. Solarz, Former U.S. Representative from Brooklyn, New York
 Beth Teper, Director of COLAGE (Children of Lesbians and Gays Everywhere)
 Shen Tong, Student leader in the Tiananmen Square protests of 1989
 Andrew H. Warren, State Attorney of Florida's 13th Judicial Circuit, Hillsborough County (1978–01)
 Micah Zenko, Senior Fellow at the Council on Foreign Relations
 Gerald Zerkin, Attorney for Zacarias Moussaoui

Science 
 Larry Abbott, Senior Fellow at Janelia Farms (HHMI); co-director, Columbia Center for Theoretical Neuroscience; member of the National Academy of Sciences
 V. Balakrishnan, Indian theoretical physicist
Eric R. Braverman, Physician
 Adam Cheyer, AI and CS scientist, co-founder of Siri, the company behind Apple's personal assistant on iOS
 Sharon K. Davis, senior scientist and head of the Social Epidemiology Research Unit at the National Human Genome Research Institute
 Judith Rich Harris, Psychologist
 Arthur G. Hunt, Plant and soils scientist
 Leslie Lamport, Computer scientist and inventor of LaTeX document preparation system
 Beatrice B. "BeBe" Magee, Chemist
 Janet Akyüz Mattei, Astronomer, former director of the American Association of Variable Star Observers
 Siddhartha Roy, Structural biologist, Shanti Swarup Bhatnagar laureate
 Philip Rubin, Cognitive scientist, CEO Emeritus, Haskins Laboratories; White House science advisor in Obama administration
 Robert H. Singer, Senior Fellow at Janelia Farm Research Campus, Howard Hughes Medical Institute, Chair of Anatomy and Structural Biology at Albert Einstein College of Medicine
 Ron Sun, Professor of Cognitive Sciences and Computer Science, RPI
 Patrick Tufts, Computer scientist and inventor
 Rachel Zimmerman, Space scientist and inventor, inventor of the Blissymbol Printer, which simplifies communication for users with physical disabilities

Sports 
 Nelson Figueroa, Major League Baseball pitcher
Mickey Fisher (1904/05–1963), basketball coach
 Jeffrey Lurie, Owner of Philadelphia Eagles NFL football team
 Tim Morehouse, Fencer, silver medal winner in men's team sabre at the 2008 Summer Olympics
 Sam Shankland, 2018 US Chess Champion

Crime, political crimes, and terrorism

 Naomi Jaffe, Social and political activist, member of the Weather Underground organization
 Katherine Ann Power, Anti-war activist and former fugitive from justice
 Susan Edith Saxe, Anti-war activist and former fugitive from justice
 Aafia Siddiqui, Neuroscientist (alleged al-Qaeda operative), convicted of assaulting and attempting to kill U.S. soldiers and FBI agents
 Laura Whitehorn, Member of the Weather Underground organization, participated in the Battle of Boston during the Boston busing crisis

Notable faculty and staff, past and present 
 John B. Anderson: United States Congressman, third-party candidate for President of the United States in 1980
 Stuart Altman: Healthcare policy economist, member of the Institute of Medicine
 Alexander Altmann: Professor of Jewish Philosophy and History of Ideas
 Teresa Amabile: Social and organizational psychologist
 Robert J. Art: International politics
 Kathleen Barry: Feminist and sociologist
 Leonard Bernstein: Composer and conductor
 Frank Bidart: Poet, awarded Bollingen Prize
 Egon Bittner: Sociologist and police science scholar
 Michael Brenner: Professor for Jewish history and culture
 Bernadette Brooten: Professor of Christian studies, member of the MacArthur Fellows Program
 Olga Broumas: Poet
 David Buchsbaum (emeritus): Member of American Academy of Arts and Sciences
 Mary Baine Campbell: Poet and critic
 Carolyn Cohen: Member of American Academy of Arts and Sciences
 Saul Cohen (emeritus): Member of American Academy of Arts and Sciences
 Frank Conroy: Memoirist, fiction writer, and director of the Iowa Writers' Workshop
 Lewis A. Coser: Sociologist, one of the founders of Dissent magazine
 J.V. Cunningham: Poet and literary critic
 Pamela Dellal: Mezzo-soprano
 Stanley Deser (emeritus): Member of American Academy of Arts and Sciences
 Mark Feeney: Pulitzer Prize-winning arts critic for The Boston Globe
 Irving Fine: Composer
 David Hackett Fischer: Pulitzer Prize-winning historian
 Benny Friedman: Pro Football Hall of Fame quarterback; Brandeis Athletic Director and last football coach
 Lawrence "Larry" Fuchs: Founder of the American Studies Department at Brandeis and immigration policy expert
 Paul Georges: Member of National Academy Museum
 Ray Ginger: Historian noted for his biography of Eugene V. Debs
 Eugene Goodheart: literary critic 
 Arthur Green: Jewish spirituality and thought
 Allen Grossman: Poet, awarded Bollingen Prize and MacArthur Fellowship "genius" grant
 Jeff Hall (emeritus): member of American Academy of Arts and Sciences, 2017 Nobel Prize in Physiology or Medicine
 Timothy J Hickey: Computer scientist
 Anita Hill: Lawyer and social policy expert
 Heisuke Hironaka: Mathematician, Fields Medal winner
 Michelle Hoover: Writer-in-residence, author
 Irving Howe: Political theorist, editor and founder of Dissent
 Hugh Huxley (emeritus): Member of the National Academy of Sciences
 Ray Jackendoff (emeritus): Member of American Academy of Arts and Sciences
 Paul Jankowski: Historian
 Gish Jen: Member of American Academy of Arts and Sciences
 William Jencks: Biochemist
 Charles Kadushin, psychologist known for social network analysis and study on Jewish populations
 William E. Kapelle: Medieval historian
 Dorothee Kern: Biochemist, former basketball player for the East Germany national team
 Jytte Klausen: European politics, author of The Cartoons that Shook the World
 Walter Laqueur: Historian and political commentator
 Max Lerner: Author, syndicated columnist, and editor
 Alvin Lucier: Composer of experimental music
 Alasdair MacIntyre: Philosopher
 Kanan Makiya: Iraqi dissident, advocate of the 2003 invasion of Iraq
 Herbert Marcuse: Social theorist and member of the Frankfurt School
 Eve Marder: Neuroscientist
 Abraham Maslow: Psychologist noted for humanistic approach
 Eileen McNamara: Pulitzer Prize- winning columnist for the Boston Globe
 Pauli Murray: Feminist, civil rights advocate, lawyer, and ordained priest
 Ulric Neisser: Pioneer in development of cognitive psychology
 Irene Pepperberg: Psychologist noted for research on cognition in animals, particularly for her work with Alex, a grey parrot
 Gregory Petsko: Biochemist
 James Pustejovsky: Linguist, proposer of Generative Lexicon theory
 Philip Rahv: Literary and social critic, editor and founder of Partisan Review
 David Rakowski: Music, runner-up for the Pulitzer Prize for Music (1999, 2002)
 Robert Reich: United States Secretary of Labor, 1993–1997
 Margret Rey: Author and illustrator of children's books, notably the Curious George series
 Adrienne Rich: Poet, essayist and feminist
 Philip Rieff: Sociologist and cultural critic
 Jehuda Reinharz: Former President of Brandeis University and current Richard Koret Professor of Modern Jewish History, and Director of the Tauber Institute for the Study of European Jewry at Brandeis.
 Eleanor Roosevelt: First Lady of the United States
 Michael Rosbash: Howard Hughes Medical Institute Investigator, 2017 Nobel Prize in Physiology or Medicine
 Dennis Ross: Special envoy/ambassador to Middle East under President Bill Clinton
 Jonathan Sarna: Historian of American Judaism
 Nahum Sarna: Biblical scholar, father of Jonathan Sarna
 Morrie Schwartz: Sociologist; subject of Mitch Albom's bestselling novel, Tuesdays with Morrie
 Arnold S. Shapiro: Mathematician
 Thomas M. Shapiro: Sociologist, author
 Mitchell Siporin: Artist
 Thomas Sowell: Economist, senior fellow at the Hoover Institution
 Marie Syrkin: Poet and author
 Andreas Teuber: Philosophy professor, actor
 Samuel O. Thier: President of both Massachusetts General Hospital and Brandeis University
 Gina G. Turrigiano: Neuroscientist, winner of the MacArthur "Genius" Award
 Claude Vigée: Poet
 Kurt Heinrich Wolff: Sociologist 
 Franz Wright: Poet, awarded Pulitzer Prize
 Yehudi Wyner: Composer, awarded Pulitzer Prize
 Leslie Zebrowitz: Social psychologist

References